Bill A "Rock" Schroeder (born Alfred A William Schroeder on September 7, 1958) is a former Major League Baseball player and a current television sports broadcaster. He played for the Milwaukee Brewers and California Angels between 1983 and 1990. Since 1995, Schroeder has been the primary color commentator on Brewers telecasts. He is currently paired with Brian Anderson or Jeff Levering when Anderson is doing national assignments for Turner Sports.

Early life 

Schroeder was born in Baltimore, Maryland, and raised in the Princeton Junction of West Windsor, New Jersey. He is a graduate of West Windsor-Plainsboro High School (now West Windsor-Plainsboro High School South). While playing high school baseball, he earned All-State honors in his junior and senior years. He attended Clemson University, and assisted the Clemson Tigers in capturing the Atlantic Coast Conference Championships in 1978 and 1979.

In 1978, Schroeder played collegiate summer baseball for the Hyannis Mets of the Cape Cod Baseball League (CCBL). He led the league in home runs and RBI, and led the Mets to the league title. Schroeder was named the league's MVP and outstanding pro prospect, and was inducted into the CCBL Hall of Fame in 2009.

Playing career 

He was selected by the Milwaukee Brewers in the eighth round of the 1979 amateur draft. Throughout his career, he was typically used as a platoon or bench player, a common subject of jokes by Schroeder and others.

Until the 2007 season, Schroeder was the fastest Brewers rookie to reach 15 home runs, achieving the milestone in only 71 games. In 2007, the record was bested by Ryan Braun, who hit 15 home runs in his first 50 games.

The 1987 season was Schroeder's best. He batted .332, and was a key member of "Team Streak", the Brewers team that won its first 13 games, tying an MLB record. On April 15, 1987, Schroeder caught the first no-hitter and only no-hitter by a single pitcher in Brewers' history, pitched by Juan Nieves. On May 16, 1987, with the Brewers playing the Kansas City Royals, Schroeder broke up a no-hitter by Royals pitcher Charlie Leibrandt with a bunt single. That would prove to be the only hit of the game.  He was also the starting catcher for the American League All stars in Nintendo's popular video game, RBI Baseball for 1987.

In 1988, he was traded to the California Angels, where he played less and was less productive than in Milwaukee. In 1990, he was released by the Angels, retiring shortly thereafter.

Announcing career 

Schroeder began his post-playing career by appearing as an analyst for a Milwaukee-area baseball television show, Baseball Sunday, in 1994. For the following season, he was asked to be the color commentator for the Milwaukee Brewers' television broadcasts, a position he has held ever since.

Schroeder appeared on WTMJ Radio's Talking Brewers from 1998 to 2000.

Schroeder manages the Brewers Fantasy Camp in Maryvale, Phoenix, Arizona, and will often discuss it during broadcasts.

References

https://www.mlb.com/brewers/news/brewers-throw-combined-no-hitter

External links
 Milwaukee Brewers: Team Broadcasts
 Bill Schroeder at baseball-reference.com

1958 births
Living people
Major League Baseball broadcasters
Major League Baseball catchers
Milwaukee Brewers announcers
Milwaukee Brewers players
Baseball players from Baltimore
Sportspeople from Mercer County, New Jersey
People from West Windsor, New Jersey
Baseball players from New Jersey
California Angels players
Clemson Tigers baseball players
Hyannis Harbor Hawks players
West Windsor-Plainsboro High School South alumni